Paul Hayes Tucker (born 1950) is an American art historian, professor, curator, and author. His specialties include Claude Monet and impressionism.

He spent over 40 years teaching at the University of California Santa Barbara, Williams College, the New York University Institute of Fine Arts, Yale University, and the Toledo Museum of Art, including 36 years teaching art history at the University of Massachusetts Boston. He has curated 16 art exhibitions and authored 11 books.

Early life
Grandson of Carlton J. H. Hayes, a history professor at Columbia University who was United States Ambassador to Spain during World War II, Tucker sought to follow in his grandfather's footsteps as a history scholar. The shift to art history came while studying at Williams College under Whitney Stoddard, Lane Faison, and William Pierson, as well as a trip to Florence to study art in his junior year, and a subsequent fellowship at the Toledo Museum of Art. Tucker became enamored with Impressionism and Claude Monet during frequent visits to the Clark Art Institute while attending Williams College. It was there he first received the inspiration to one day reunite the artist's Rouen Cathedral (Monet series) in a single exhibition – something he accomplished at the Boston Museum of Fine Arts in 1990.

A member of the so-called "Williams Mafia", a group who graduated from Williams College in the 1960s and 1970s, Tucker also served as an All-American defensive end on the football team while earning his undergraduate degree.

As an art history graduate student at Yale, where he earned his PhD in 1979, Tucker studied under Robert L. Herbert, a pioneer in developing the social history of art. Tucker's dissertation became his first book: Monet at Argenteuil.

Exhibitions
Tucker set the attendance record of the Boston Museum of Fine Arts in 1990 with his "Monet in the '90s" exhibition, only to break his own record with "Monet in the 20th Century". He has also curated exhibitions beyond Impressionism into post-war American art as a guest curator for other museums.

 Monet's Garden. Impressions of Giverny. The New York Botanical Garden, May 19 – October 22, 2012
 Claude Monet. Late Work. Gagosian Gallery, New York, May–June 2010
 DoubleTake. From Monet to Lichtenstein. Selections from the Paul G. Allen Collection. Experience Music Project, Seattle, April 2006 – January 2007.
 The Sculpture of William Tucker. State Street, Santa Barbara, CA, January–June 2002.
 Renoir. From Outsider to Old Master, 1870–1992. Bridgestone Museum, Tokyo, and the Nagoya City Art Museum, Nagoya, February–June 2001.
 The Impressionists at Argenteuil. National Gallery of Art, Washington, and the Wadsworth Atheneum, Hartford, May–December 2000.
 Monet in the 20th Century. Museum of Fine Arts, Boston and the Royal Academy of Arts, London, September 1998 – April 1999.
 Claude Monet. A Retrospective. Bridgestone Museum, Tokyo, the Nagoya City Art Museum, and the Hiroshima Museum of Art, February–July 1994.
 Tuscany Rediscovered: Richard Upton at Cortona.  Everson Museum, Syracuse, N.Y., the Krannert Art Gallery, Champaign-Urbana, IL, The New Britain Museum of American Art, New Britain, CT, and the James A. Mitchner Museum, Doylestown, PA, May 1991 – June 1993.
 Monet in the 90s. The Series Paintings. Museum of Fine Arts, Boston, The Art Institute of Chicago, and the Royal Academy of Arts, London, February–December 1990.
 Masterworks from the Collection of Mr. & Mrs. David Lloyd Kreeger. Corcoran Museum of Art, Washington, D.C., February–May 1989.
 Architectural Drawings for Modern Publish Buildings in New Haven, Yale University Art Gallery, New Haven, CT, 1974.
 The Cubist Image in the Graphic Arts. Yale University Art Gallery, New Haven, CT, 1973.
 Death: Realism, Allegory, Ritual.  Toledo Museum of Art, OH, 1973.
 The Museum as Concept-Creation. Toledo Museum of Art, OH, 1972.
 Rembrandt and the Italian Renaissance. Toledo Museum of Art, OH, 1972.

Selected publications

Honors and awards

 International Art Critics’ Award for curating the best exhibition (Claude Monet. Late Work) at a commercial gallery in New York City, 2010
 Chancellor's Award for Distinguished Scholarship, UMass Boston, 1999, 1991
 Chancellor's Award for Distinguished Service, UMass Boston, 1991
 Governors’ Award, Yale University Press, 1990 (given by the Board of Governors of Yale University Press for the best book the Press published by an author under 40 years old)
 The Florence Gould Arts Foundation Grant, 1988, 1984
 UMass Boston Faculty Development Grant, 1988, 1981, 1980
 UMass Boston Healy Grant, 1988
 UMass Boston Public Service Grant, 1988
 American Council of Learned Societies Grant, 1985
 Danforth Foundation Associate for Excellence in College Teaching, 1981
 UMass Boston Faculty/Staff Union Grant, 1981
 Samuel H. Kress Foundation Fellowship, 1976–1977
 Samuel H. Kress Foundation Travel Grant, 1975, 1976
 Toledo Museum of Art Fellowship for Advanced Study, 1973–1974
 Toledo Museum of Art, Educational Fellowship, 1972–1973

Personal life
He is married to Maggie Moss-Tucker, and has two children, actor Jonathan Tucker and Jennie Taylor Tucker. Tucker retired from his position at UMass Boston to move to California in 2014, where he continues to work in the area of 19th and 20th century art. His most recent book is a college textbook on modern art titled Never Neutral. Modern Art: Courbet to Pollock.

References

External links
 Art Historian Paul Hayes Tucker, UMass Boston
 Arts on the Point: An Interview with Paul Tucker, UMass Boston
 The Legend of the Williams Art Mafia – Williams College Reunion 2010 lecture by Lisa Corrin

1950 births
American art historians
Living people
University of California, Santa Barbara faculty
Williams College alumni